is a railway station in the city of Hirosaki, Aomori Prefecture, Japan, operated by the private railway operator, Kōnan Railway Company

Lines
Ishikawapūrumae Station is served by the Kōnan Railway Ōwani Line, and lies 3.0 kilometers from the southern terminus of the line at Ōwani Station.

Station layout
The station has one side platform serving  single bi-directional track. There is no station building, but only a weather shelter on the platform. The station is unattended.

Adjacent stations

History
Ishikawapūrumae Station was opened on October 1, 2002 with the opening of the Hirosaki City Ishikawa Swimming Pool. Its 25.3 million yen construction cost was financed by the Hirosaki City government.

Surrounding area
Hirosaki City Ishikawa Swimming Pool

See also
 List of railway stations in Japan

External links

Kōnan Railway home page 
Location map  

Railway stations in Aomori Prefecture
Konan Railway
Railway stations in Japan opened in 2002
Hirosaki